In United States v. Johnson, 221 U.S. 488 (1911), the United States Supreme Court ruled that the misbranding provisions of the Pure Food and Drug Act of 1906 did not pertain to false curative or therapeutic statements but only false statements as to the identity of the drug.

In 1912, Congress responded with the Sherley Amendments, which addressed the perceived lack of enforcement of fraud related to therapeutic claims;: The Act was amended to prohibit false and fraudulent claims of health benefits but enforcement under the amendment required proof of fraudulent intent, a difficult standard. The misbranding amendment required a curative or therapeutic product to bear a label with a quantity or proportion statement for specified narcotic substances:

References

External links
 
 

United States Supreme Court cases
United States Supreme Court cases of the White Court
1911 in United States case law
Food and Drug Administration